The 2019–20 West Bank First League is the 34th season of the West Bank First League, the second tier football league in the West Bank of Palestine. The season started on 20 September 2020.

League table

See also
2019–20 West Bank Premier League
2019–20 Palestine Cup

References

West Bank Premier League seasons
2
West Bank